The Long Ships  is a 1964 Anglo–Yugoslav adventure film shot in Technirama directed by Jack Cardiff and starring Richard Widmark, Sidney Poitier, Russ Tamblyn and Rosanna Schiaffino.

Background
The film was very loosely based on the Swedish novel The Long Ships by Frans G. Bengtsson (1941–1945), retaining little more than the title (of the English translation) and the Moorish settings of Orm's first voyage. Although the protagonist is named Rolfe, the film was released in Sweden with the title Röde Orm och de långa skeppen (Red Orm and the Long Ships), in a further attempt to exploit the popularity of the novel. It was also intended to capitalise on the success of recent Viking and Moorish dramas such as The Vikings (1958) and El Cid (1961) and was later followed by Alfred the Great (1969).

Plot
The story centres on an immense golden bell named the Mother of Voices, which may or may not exist. Moorish king Aly Mansuh (Sidney Poitier) is convinced that it does. Having collected all the legendary material about it that he can, he plans to mount an expedition to search for it. When a shipwrecked Norseman, Rolfe (Richard Widmark), repeats the story of the bell in the marketplace, and hints that he knows its location, he is seized by Mansuh's men and brought in for questioning. Rolfe insists that he does not know more than the legend itself and that the bell is most likely only a myth. He manages to escape by jumping through a window before the questioning continues under torture.

After swimming back to return home, Rolfe reveals to his father Krok and his brother Orm that he did indeed hear the bell pealing on the night his ship was wrecked in Africa. However, Rolfe's father has been made destitute after spending a fortune building a funeral ship for the Danish king, Harald Bluetooth, who then refuses to reimburse him by citing an outstanding debt. Rationalising that the ship does not yet belong to Harald (since he is still living), Rolfe and Orm not only steal the ship, but hire a number of inebriated Vikings to serve as its crew. In order to prevent Harald from killing his father in revenge for the theft, he also takes the king's daughter as a hostage. Harald declares that he will summon every longship he can find and rescue her.

Since the ship was intended as a funeral ship, the crew begins to get superstitious and demands to return home. Rolfe asks the ship's captain what's the way to sway the bad luck off them, and he states that a maiden must be sacrificed to the gods. He pretends to do so (he kills a sheep instead) and later reveals the trick to Orm. After prolonged difficulties at sea, the ship is damaged in a maelstrom, and the Norse are cast ashore in a Moorish shore. After getting attacked and captured by the Moors, the Norse are condemned to execution, where Mansuh reencounters Rolfe and again demands to know where the Mother of Voices is. Mansuh's favourite wife Aminah (Rosanna Schiaffino) convinces her husband to use them and their longship to retrieve the bell. After they sail to the Pillars of Hercules, Rolfe and Mansuh find only a domed chapel with a small bronze bell where the Viking was certain he had heard the Mother of Voices. Frustrated, Rolfe throws the hanging bell against a wall, and the resounding cacophony reveals that the chapel dome itself is the disguised Mother of Voices.

After a costly misadventure topples the Mother of Voices from its clifftop down to the sea, the expedition finally returns to the Moorish city, Aly Mansuh triumphantly riding through the streets with the bell in tow. However, King Harald and his men, including Krok, out to rescue the princess, have since conquered the city, and upon Aly Mansuh's arrival they leap out of hiding. The climactic battle ensues, and ends when the bell falls over and crushes Aly Mansuh; the Moors are defeated and the Vikings victorious. The film ends with Rolfe trying his best to persuade King Harald to mount another expedition for the "three crowns of the Saxon kings", much to Krok's amusement.

Cast

Production
Bruce Geller wrote the first draft of the script. Irving Allen announced he would make it for a budget of £2 million (US$5.6 million).

The film was originally meant to be directed by José Ferrer, who had made The Cockleshell Heroes for Irwin Allen. Ferrer said he was looking for "a Burt Lancaster type and a Tony Curtis type and two girls" for the lead. He was not intending to act in the film. However, Ferrer dropped out and was replaced by Jack Cardiff; Richard Widmark was signed to star.

The film was to be shot in Yugoslavia. George Peppard claimed he turned down a lead role despite a fee of $200,000 because he did not want to spend six months in that country.

"It is obvious that Tito's government is anxious to see more and more foreign filmmakers come to Yugoslavia", said Allen. "And of course it is also in the best interests of the American and British governments to encourage anything that improves Yugoslavia's financial independence from the Soviet bloc. I'm sure Belgrade will soon catch up with London and Rome."

Filming took place on Avala Hill.

The American Legion condemned the production of the film – along with another Hollywood financed film shot in Yugoslavia, Lancelot and Guinevere – as "immoral, deceptive, unethical and detrimental to the best interests of the United States and the free world."

"It wasn't a happy time", said Widmark of the shoot.

Reception
The film performed very well in the United Kingdom, grossing $840,000. It was among the ten most popular films of the year at the British box office in 1964.

In the US and Canada it earned rentals of $1,930,000.

Awards
Nominee Best Costume Design – BAFTA (Anthony Mendleson)

See also 
Great Bell of Dhammazedi

References

External links

Cinema: A Thing of Booty, Time, 12 June 1964

1963 films
1960s adventure films
Films shot in Montenegro
Columbia Pictures films
1960s English-language films
Films based on Swedish novels
English-language Yugoslav films
Films directed by Jack Cardiff
Films set in the Viking Age
Films set in the 10th century
Films set in Africa
Films shot in Yugoslavia
Harald Bluetooth
Films with screenplays by Berkely Mather
British adventure films
British epic films
Yugoslav adventure films
Films with screenplays by Beverley Cross
1960s British films